Roy Gater (22 June 1940 – 1 May 2017) was an English footballer who played for Port Vale, Bournemouth & Boscombe Athletic, Crewe Alexandra, Weymouth, Dorchester Town and Christchurch. He made 412 league and cup appearances in a 13-year career in the Football League.

Career
Gater passed through the Port Vale youth team to sign professional forms under Norman Low in April 1960. He made his debut on 4 April 1961, in a 1–1 draw with Coventry City at Highfield Road. He played one further Third Division game in 1960–61, and was also a member of the side that won the Supporters' Clubs' Trophy. He only made three league and two FA Cup appearances at Vale Park during the 1961–62 season. He was sold to Bill McGarry's Bournemouth & Boscombe Athletic for a "small fee" in June 1962. The "Cherries" finished fifth in the Third Division in 1962–63, before new boss Reg Flewin took the club to fourth in 1963–64 and 11th in 1964–65. Freddie Cox then took charge, leading Bournemouth to 18th in 1965–66, 20th in 1966–67, and 12th in 1967–68. In his six years at Dean Court, Gater scored three goals in 216 league appearances. He then transferred to Ernie Tagg's Crewe Alexandra, who would go on to be relegated into the Fourth Division in 1968–69. They finished 15th in 1969–70, before new boss Tom McAnearney took the "Alex" to 15th spot again in 1970–71. The "Railwaymen" then finished bottom of the Football League in 1971–72, before Jimmy Melia failed to lead them out of the re-election zone in 1972–73. In five years at Gresty Road, Gater scored five goals in 156 league games. He moved on to Southern League side Weymouth, Dorchester Town and Christchurch (as player-manager). He later became a coach at Poole Town before returning to Christchurch as manager.

Career statistics
Source:

References

1940 births
2017 deaths
Sportspeople from Newcastle-under-Lyme
English footballers
Association football midfielders
Port Vale F.C. players
AFC Bournemouth players
Crewe Alexandra F.C. players
Weymouth F.C. players
Dorchester Town F.C. players
Christchurch F.C. players
English Football League players
Southern Football League players
Association football coaches
Association football player-managers
English football managers
Christchurch F.C. managers